Birine District is a district of Djelfa Province, Algeria.

Municipalities
The district is further divided into 2 municipalities:
Birine
Benhar

Districts of Djelfa Province